Golden Demond Johnson (born October 23, 1974 in Wichita Falls, Texas, U.S.) is a professional boxer in the Welterweight division. He's the former three-time NABF champion at Lightweight, Light Welterweight, and Welterweight.

Personal life
Golden Johnson is the cousin of former world champion Reggie Johnson.  He was born in Wichita Falls, Texas, and is a resident of Killeen, Texas.He currently lives in San Antonio, Texas.

Professional career
Johnson made his debut in professional boxing with a first-round knockout win over Chris George on September 3, 1993.  Johnson then lost in his very next fight, a second-round knockout at the hands of Pedro Calderon.  Johnson's career failed to take off immediately, as he compiled a record of 4 wins, 1 loss, and 2 draws in the first year of his career.

Starting in October 1994, however, Johnson went on an eleven fight win streak before losing too title contender Israel Cardona (29-2).

IBF Lightweight Championship
In January 1999, Golden lost to an undefeated Shane Mosley, the bout was for the IBF Lightweight Championship. Johnson continued to win most of his fights in subsequent years mixing in losses against boxers including Ben Tackie and Vivian Harris.

WBO Inter-Continental
In 2006 he breathed new life into his career with an upset win over prospect Oscar Diaz, setting up a fight for the vacant WBO Inter-Continental Welterweight Championship against American Antonio Margarito. Johnson was dispatched quickly by Margarito, losing by TKO at 2:28 of the 1st round.

Professional boxing record 

| style="text-align:center;" colspan="8"|25 wins (18 knockouts, 7 decisions), 8 losses, 3 draws
|-  style="text-align:center; background:#e3e3e3;"
|  style="border-style:none none solid solid; "|Res.
|  style="border-style:none none solid solid; "|Record
|  style="border-style:none none solid solid; "|Opponent
|  style="border-style:none none solid solid; "|Type
|  style="border-style:none none solid solid; "|Rd., Time
|  style="border-style:none none solid solid; "|Date
|  style="border-style:none none solid solid; "|Location
|  style="border-style:none none solid solid; "|Notes
|- align=center
|Loss
|25-8-3
|align=left| Antonio Margarito
|
|
|
|align=left|
|align=left|
|- align=center
|Win
|25-7-3
|align=left| Oscar Díaz
|
|
|
|align=left|
|align=left|
|- align=center
|Draw
|24-7-3
|align=left| Larry Mosley
|
|
|
|align=left|
|align=left|
|- align=center
|Win
|24-7-2
|align=left| Ramon Gomez
|
|
|
|align=left|
|align=left|
|- align=center
|Win
|23-7-2
|align=left| Freddy Hernandez
| 
|
|
|align=left|
|align=left|
|- align=center
|Loss
|22-7-2
|align=left| Sebastian Valdez
| 
|
|
|align=left|
|align=left|
|- align=center
|Loss
|22-6-2
|align=left| Cosme Rivera
| 
|
|
|align=left|
|align=left|
|- align=center
|Win
|22-5-2
|align=left| Chantel Stanciel
| 
|
|
|align=left|
|align=left|
|- align=center
|Win
|21-5-2
|align=left| Johnny Casas
| 
|
|
|align=left|
|align=left|
|- align=center
|Loss
|20-5-2
|align=left| Vivian Harris
| 
|
|
|align=left|
|align=left|
|- align=center
|}

References

External links

1974 births
Living people
Boxers from Texas
Welterweight boxers
People from Wichita Falls, Texas
American male boxers